RMAS Goosander (A164) was a mooring, salvage and boom vessel of the Royal Maritime Auxiliary Service. She saw service in the Falklands War. She has a sister ship, RMAS Pochard, and was built by Robb Caledon Shipbuilders in Leith.

References

Royal Maritime Auxiliary Service
Falklands War naval ships of the United Kingdom